Christopher Frank Capuano (born August 19, 1978) is an American former professional baseball pitcher whose professional playing career spanned from 2000 through 2016. He played in Major League Baseball (MLB) for the Arizona Diamondbacks, Milwaukee Brewers, New York Mets, Los Angeles Dodgers, Boston Red Sox, and New York Yankees, and was an All Star in 2006.

Early life
Capuano graduated from St. Thomas School in West Springfield, Massachusetts. Four years later, Capuano was the valedictorian of his class at Cathedral High School in Springfield, Massachusetts and went on to earn a degree in Economics at Duke University, where he earned membership in Phi Beta Kappa. He was also a member of the Xi chapter of Alpha Tau Omega fraternity. In 1997 and 1998, he played collegiate summer baseball with the Cotuit Kettleers of the Cape Cod Baseball League, and returned to the league in 1999 to play for the Bourne Braves.

Professional career

Arizona Diamondbacks
Capuano was drafted by the Arizona Diamondbacks in the 8th round of the 1999 amateur draft (238th overall). He played with South Bend Silver Hawks of the Class A Midwest League in 2000 and the El Paso Diablos of the Class AA Texas League in 2001. He began 2002 with the Tucson Sidewinders of the Class AAA Pacific Coast League (PCL) and was 4–1 with a 2.72 ERA when, on May 17, he had Tommy John surgery and missed the rest of the season.

He made his MLB debut with the Diamondbacks on May 4, 2003, against the Atlanta Braves, picking up the loss in a two-inning appearance in extra innings. He made his first start on May 17 against the Pittsburgh Pirates, but only lasted 4 and  innings while allowing seven earned runs to take the loss. He was optioned back to the minors after that start and called back up for a spot start on July 9 against the San Diego Padres, where he worked seven innings, allowed only one unearned run and picked up his first victory. He returned to the minors after the appearance, where he made 23 starts for Tucson, with a 9–5 record and 3.34 ERA, earning him PCL All-Star honors. He returned to the Diamondbacks when rosters expanded in September and overall appeared in 9 games for them, with 5 starts, and was 2–4 with a 4.64 ERA.

Milwaukee Brewers

On December 1, 2003, Capuano was traded to the Milwaukee Brewers (along with Craig Counsell, Lyle Overbay, Junior Spivey, Jorge de la Rosa and Chad Moeller) for Shane Nance, Richie Sexson and minor leaguer Noochie Varner. He made 17 starts for the Brewers in 2004 and was 6–8 with a 4.99 ERA.

His 2005 season with the Brewers proved to be a break-out year as he posted 18 wins, the highest total for a Brewer since Teddy Higuera in 1987. He also led the National League in quality starts during the 2005 season. In 2006, Capuano continued his excellent pitching by taking over as the team's new ace with Ben Sheets injured and was named to the 2006 Major League Baseball All-Star Game as a replacement for Tom Glavine. Capuano, however, ended up with only 11 wins in 2006.

Capuano started the 2007 season 5–0 and then the Milwaukee Brewers lost the next 22 games Capuano pitched in from May 12 to September 28. In June he hit his first major league home run against the Florida Marlins.

Before the start of the 2008 season, he underwent Tommy John surgery for the second time in his career and missed the entire season.

The Brewers non-tendered Capuano following the 2008 season, making him a free agent but re-signed him to a minor league deal shortly after. Before the start of the 2009 season Capuano had hoped to start live game pitching in mid May, but was limited to a handful of games in the Brewers rookie leagues. After becoming a free agent at the end of the season, Capuano was re-signed to a minor league contract with the Brewers on November 23, 2009.

Capuano was invited to the Milwaukee Brewers' spring training for the 2010 season, but early on he complained of arm soreness and was placed in extended spring training. He would start the regular season with the Single A, Brevard County Manatees of the Florida State League. Capuano would only need 3 appearances with the Manatees before being promoted to the Triple A Nashville Sounds. In those 3 appearances, Capuano registered a 2–0 record with a 1.23 ERA and 17 strikeouts in 14 innings pitched. On May 28, 2010, Capuano made his final start for the Sounds, and was pulled after four innings. After the game, it was announced the Brewers had purchased his minor league contract and he was recalled to the majors.

Capuano started the Brewers' June 3, 2010 game against the Florida Marlins in Miami, giving up three runs on seven hits in 3 innings while striking out four and walking one. He was charged with the loss in the 3–2 Marlins win. On July 3, 2010, he appeared in a Brewers victory against the St. Louis Cardinals in St. Louis. This snapped the streak of 26 straight losses he had appeared in between 2007 and 2010.

New York Mets

Capuano signed with the New York Mets before the 2011 season. On August 26, pitching against the Atlanta Braves, he threw his first complete game shutout since 2005, setting a career high in strikeouts in a game with 13. He made 31 starts for the Mets in 2011, his most since 2006, and also appeared in relief twice. He was 11–12 with a 4.55 ERA during the season.

Los Angeles Dodgers
On December 2, 2011, Capuano signed a two-year deal with the Los Angeles Dodgers. He started the 2012 season strong, with a 9–4 record and 2.91 in his first 18 starts but went only 3–8 with a 4.76 in his last 15 starts. Overall, he was 12–12 with a 3.72 in 33 starts.

Capuano began the 2013 season in the bullpen due to the Dodgers having too many starting pitchers. He got a chance to start on April 16 due to an injury to Zack Greinke but suffered his own injury, a strained left calf, in the game and only lasted three innings. He wound up making 20 starts for the team in 2013, despite missing time with various injuries. He also appeared in 4 games out of the bullpen. His final record was 4–7 with a 4.26 ERA.

Boston Red Sox
On February 20, 2014, Capuano reportedly agreed to a $2.25 million one-year contract with the Boston Red Sox. He passed his physical and the deal was made official on February 22, 2014.

Capuano began the 2014 season with 15 consecutive scoreless innings. From May 3, 2014, through June 23, 2014, he allowed 17 runs over  innings. On June 25, 2014, he was designated for assignment. He was released on July 1.

Colorado Rockies
Shortly after his release from the Red Sox, he signed a minor league deal with the Colorado Rockies.  He pitched for the Tulsa Drillers of the Texas League and the Colorado Springs Sky Sox of the PCL, making a total of four starts between the two teams.

New York Yankees
On July 24, 2014. Capuano was traded to the New York Yankees from the Rockies for cash considerations.
In 12 starts for the Yankees, Capuano went 2–3 with a 4.25 ERA.

Despite being a free agent, Capuano pitched for the MLB All Star team in the 2014 MLB Japan All Star Series. Wearing a Yankee uniform, he started two games for the MLB All Stars, allowing just one earned run on five hits and striking out seven batters.

On December 16, 2014, Capuano re-signed with the Yankees on a one-year, $5 million contract. He was designated for assignment on July 29, 2015. He was called back up by the Yankees on August 12 and designated for assignment again three days later. The Yankees then recalled him again on August 18 to take the place of Bryan Mitchell, who had been injured by a line drive during a spot start the previous evening. After being designated for assignment once again on August 22, he elected free agency on August 24. However, due to an injury to CC Sabathia, Capuano immediately re-signed with the Yankees. He was designated for assignment yet again the following day when Michael Pineda was activated from the DL. He was called up again on September 7.

Second stint with the Brewers
Capuano signed a minor league deal with the Milwaukee Brewers in January 2016, and went on to make the big league club out of spring training. He pitched well out of the bullpen for the Brewers for the first two months of the season until he sustained an elbow injury while pitching in a game versus the Atlanta Braves.

Retirement
On March 6, 2018, Capuano retired from professional baseball.

International career
Capuano played on Team USA in the 2001 World Cup of Baseball and helped the team earn a silver medal. Chris also represented the Major League All Stars Versus the Japanese All Stars in several exhibition games in Japan in November of both 2006 and 2014.

Pitching style
Capuano was generally more of a finesse pitcher who relied on his deceptive delivery, accuracy and ability to change speeds. He threw his fastball in the upper 80s on average, and would sometimes reach the low 90s as well, especially early in games or later in his career during relief appearances. Capuano also featured a slider and a changeup, and possessed an excellent pickoff move. In 2005, he led the major leagues in pickoffs with 12.

Personal life
Capuano was a three sport athlete growing up, playing baseball, basketball and soccer before focusing on baseball in college.  His father, Frank Capuano, was also a standout athlete who played as a shortstop and centerfielder for American International College in Springfield, Massachusetts.  While a member of the Milwaukee Brewers, Capuano, along with teammates J. J. Hardy, Bill Hall, and Jeff Suppan, appeared in an episode of The Young and the Restless on June 20, 2007.  Capuano grew up a Red Sox fan.

After his playing career, Chris furthered his education with an MBA from MIT's Sloan Fellows Program (Class of 2019).  While at MIT, he became a Strategy and Development Advisor for Proteus Motion, Inc., focusing initially on its flagship fitness and training technology called Proteus. He was appointed Director of Operations with the Major League Baseball Players Association (MLBPA) on July 5, 2019.

References

External links

1978 births
Living people
Albuquerque Isotopes players
Arizona Diamondbacks players
Arizona League Brewers players
Baseball players from Massachusetts
Beloit Snappers players
Boston Red Sox players
Bourne Braves players
Brevard County Manatees players
Colorado Springs Sky Sox players
Cotuit Kettleers players
Duke Blue Devils baseball players
El Paso Diablos players
High Desert Mavericks players
Indianapolis Indians players
Los Angeles Dodgers players
Major League Baseball pitchers
Milwaukee Brewers players
Nashville Sounds players
National League All-Stars
New York Mets players
New York Yankees players
People from West Springfield, Massachusetts
South Bend Silver Hawks players
Tucson Sidewinders players
Tulsa Drillers players